Seán Quinn (born 1947) is an Irish businessman.

Sean Quinn may also refer to:
 Sean Quinn (cyclist) (born 2000), American cyclist
Sean Quinn (writer) (born 1971)
Sean Quinn, a character in Merry Happy Whatever

See also
John Quinn (disambiguation)
San Quinn
Shawn Quinn, bridge player
Shawn Quinn (American football), American football coach